Edward Jovy Jacinto Marcelo (April 20, 1965 – May 15, 1992), better known simply as Jovy Marcelo, was a Filipino race car driver from Quezon City, Philippines, who was killed in an accident during practice for the 1992 Indianapolis 500.

Early career and education
Marcelo came from a racing family, with his father Edward ("Eddie") racing dragsters, motorcycles, and speedboats in Southeast Asia (mainly in Malaysia, the Philippines and Macau).  He began his racing career at the age of 11 in go-karts.

He studied in the United States at St. Mary's and at Armstrong College (Berkeley, California).

Career
Bitten with the racing bug, he pursued racing full-time right after graduating with a business degree. With the financial support of his father, Marcelo raced in junior formulas in the United Kingdom before moving to the New Zealand series.

In 1990, Marcelo returned to the United States and competed in the Toyota Atlantic Championship with Duane Anderson's team. Marcelo finished second in the championship behind Mark Dismore and earned the Rookie of the Year title.

In 1991, Marcelo continued in Toyota Atlantic, replacing Dismore in Bill Fickling's P-1 Racing Team. Marcelo won races at Lime Rock Park and Nazareth Speedway. Marcelo won the season championship, beating Jimmy Vasser by four points.

CART career
In 1992, Marcelo graduated to the CART PPG Cup. Marcelo had a pre-season test with Derrick Walker's Walker Motorsports, and earned a seat with the Euromotorsport team owned by Antonio Ferrari. Marcelo competed in three CART PPG Cup events, finishing 14th in Surfers Paradise (Australia), 19th in Phoenix and 19th in Long Beach. (He did not score points in these events;  CART points only awarded to 12th, plus pole and most laps awards.) In May, Marcelo was entered in the Indianapolis 500 driving a Lola T91/00-Cosworth DFS and participated in rookie orientation and practice for the event.

Death
He died instantly due to a blunt force head injury. It was alleged that Marcelo's helmet only had an anti-rotational tether strap on the left side of his head, leaving his head and neck vulnerable on the right (drivers subsequently wore them on both sides as a preventative measure; the HANS Device was not mandatory until 2001). Marcelo was 27 at the time of his death. He died on the tenth anniversary of the death of Gordon Smiley, who died at the same track while attempting to qualify for the 1982 Indianapolis 500. Marcelo left behind his wife Irene, son Karsten, and an unborn son who was given the name Jovy Nicolai.

Funeral services were held for him in Hillsborough, California before his remains were flown back to the Philippines. He was laid to rest at the Loyola Memorial Park in Marikina.

Legacy
Following his death, the Toyota Atlantic Championship created the Jovy Marcelo Sportsmanship Award, which is given annually to the driver who best exemplifies the sportsmanship of Marcelo. The First Jovy Marcelo sportsmanship award was presented to Bert Hart for the 1992–1993 season. He named his first son Jovy Kakoa Hart. Frankie Muniz won the 2008 IMSA Cooper Tires Atlantic Championship Jovy Marcelo Sportsmanship Award.

Career results

Atlantic Championship

Complete CART results

See also
List of Indianapolis 500 fatal accidents

References

External links
Profile on ChampCar stats
Profile on Driver DataBase
Profile on Racing Reference
May 2002 article from RacingPress.com
May 2003 article from the (Manila) Sunday Enquirer Magazine
Rear View: Jovy Marcelo, 25 years on 

1965 births
1992 deaths
Filipino racing drivers
Champ Car drivers
Atlantic Championship drivers
People from Quezon City
Sportspeople from Quezon City
Racing drivers who died while racing
Sports deaths in Indiana
Filmed deaths in motorsport
EuroInternational drivers
Burials at the Loyola Memorial Park